Houstoun is a surname. Notable people with the surname include:

 John Houstoun (1744 – 1796), American lawyer and statesman from Savannah, Georgia
 Dr. William Houstoun (botanist) (1695–1733), British surgeon and botanist
 William Houstoun (lawyer) (1755–1813), American lawyer, Continental Congressman for Georgia
 Sir William Houstoun (fl. 1830s), British army officer, Governor of Gibraltar

See also 
 Houston (disambiguation)
 Heuston, a surname